The Göteborg class was a Swedish World War II destroyer class. Built from 1936–1941 the class was designed as escort and neutral guard destroyers. After World War II the destroyers, later rebuilt as frigates, continued to serve in the Swedish navy. The last ship was decommissioned in 1968.

History 

In 1933 the Swedish government granted the construction of two new destroyers. The destroyers were given names of Swedish coast towns and so this class was called Stadsjagare ("Town-class destroyers"). The first ship was delivered in 1936 and the second in 1937. In 1936 two additional destroyers were ordered and after the war broke out a third pair was ordered as well. After the war all destroyers except Göteborg which was in poor shape from the Hårsfjärden disaster received a refit where the center gun was moved to the X position on the aft deckhouse and the anti-aircraft armament (consisting of four modern Bofors 40 mm L/70 guns) was concentrated on a platform around the rear funnel. In 1958–1963 three of the destroyers were rebuilt as frigates that included a change of armament. The first ship to be decommissioned was Göteborg in 1958. In the decade that followed all ships were decommissioned, the last in 1968.

The famous Swedish marine engineer Curt Borgenstam called the Göteborg class the most beautiful and well working destroyer class to have served in the Swedish navy.

Ships

References

Sources

Destroyers of the Swedish Navy
Destroyer classes